Pamvotida is a former municipality in the Ioannina regional unit, Epirus, Greece. Since the 2011 local government reform it is part of the municipality Ioannina, of which it is a municipal unit. It is named after the Lake of Ioannina, which is also known as Pamvotida. The municipal unit has an area of 138.616 km2. Population 10,468 (2011). The seat of the municipality was in Katsikas.

References

Populated places in Ioannina (regional unit)